The 2013 season is the 61st season of competitive football in Singapore.

The season began on 20 February 2013 for the S.League, 1 March 2013 for the Prime League and 27 April 2013 for the NFL First, Second and Third Divisions.

S.League

Team changes
Gombak United FC withdrew their participation in the league based on financial considerations.
Harimau Muda A were replaced by Harimau Muda B.
Geylang United reverted their name to Geylang International.
Singapore Armed Forces FC were renamed to Warriors F.C..

Singapore National Football League

Promotion and relegation (pre-season)

Teams relegated from NFL Division 1
 Singapore Armed Forces Sports Association
 Borussia Zamrud Football Club

Teams promoted to NFL Division 1
 Admiralty FC
 Sporting Westlake Football Club

Teams relegated from NFL Division 2
 Balestier United Recreation Club

Teams promoted to NFL Division 2
 Gambas Avenue Sports Club

Honours

League and Cup champions

Men's Senior Team

Following Radojko Avramović's resignation after Singapore's victory in the 2012 AFF Suzuki Cup, LionsXII coach V Sundramoorthy was announced as the stand-in head coach while the FAS searched for a new coach to fill the vacancy.

On 15 May 2013, former Belarus coach Bernd Stange was unveiled as the new head coach of the Singapore national football team.

Managerial changes

Fixtures and results

1 Non FIFA 'A' international match

Singapore Selection Matches

Singapore Olympic Foundation - Peter Lim Charity Cup
The Singapore Olympic Foundation - Peter Lim Charity Cup was an exhibition fundraising match between the Singapore Selection and 2013 Copa del Rey winners, Atlético Madrid.

The match was held at the Jalan Besar Stadium on 22 May 2013 and Atlético Madrid prevailed with a 2-0 scoreline with goals coming from Raúl García and Diego Costa.

1 Non FIFA 'A' international match

Representation in AFC Cup

Singapore was represented in the 2013 AFC Cup by 2012 S.League champions Tampines Rovers and 2012 Singapore Cup winners Warriors F.C.

Both teams failed to qualify for the knockout stage, finishing bottom of Group H and Group E respectively.

Warriors F.C.'s Performance in AFC CUP Group E

Tampines Rovers' Performance in AFC CUP Group H

References

 
Seasons in Singaporean football